Ordib (also Romanized as Ordīb and Ardīb; also known as Urdib) is a village in Nakhlestan Rural District, in the Central District of Khur and Biabanak County, Isfahan Province, Iran. At the 2006 census, its population was 237, in 71 families.

References 

Populated places in Khur and Biabanak County